The 1990 Alabama Crimson Tide football team represented the University of Alabama for the 1990 NCAA Division I-A football season. The Crimson Tide was led by first-year head coach Gene Stallings, replacing Bill Curry who left for the University of Kentucky.

Early in the 1990 season, the Tide and new coach Gene Stallings lost three games by a combined total of eight points. In the opener against Southern Miss, star tailback Siran Stacy tore ligaments in his knee and missed the rest of the season.  Against Florida, Alabama lost another star player for the year in wide receiver Craig Sanderson and quarterback Gary Hollingsworth threw three interceptions to Florida safety Will White, and the Gators scored the winning touchdown on a blocked punt.

After wins over lightly regarded Vanderbilt and SW Louisiana (now Louisiana-Lafayette), Bama traveled to Knoxville to face undefeated, third-ranked Tennessee. The result was a shocking 9–6 upset victory, Alabama's fifth in a row in the Third Saturday in October rivalry. The game was a defensive struggle and a field goal duel. UT's kicker Greg Burke, who hit a 51-yard field goal try to tie the game with ten minutes left, attempted a 50-yarder for the win with 1:35 to go, but Alabama's Stacy Harrison blocked the kick and the ball bounced to the Tennessee 37-yard line. The Crimson Tide advanced the ball seven yards on three running plays, setting up Philip Doyle's third field goal, a game-winning 48-yarder as time expired.

The next game was a 9–0 loss to Penn State in which Hollingsworth threw five interceptions and Bama rushed for only six yards.  However, Alabama bounced back to win four in a row and salvage a winning season after the 0–3 start. Alabama won its first Iron Bowl in five years, dominating Auburn defensively and winning 16–7. It was the seventh game in a row in which the Alabama defense held the opposition to single digits.  The season ended with a lopsided 34–7 bowl loss to Louisville, and Alabama finished 7–5.

Schedule

Source: Rolltide.com: 1990 Alabama football schedule

Personnel

Season summary

Southern Mississippi

Florida

Statistics
Note: Does not include Fiesta Bowl.

Overall

Scoring

Passing

References

Alabama
Alabama Crimson Tide football seasons
Alabama Crimson Tide football